Fikile is a given name. Notable people with the name include:

Fikile Khosa, Zambian footballer
Fikile Magadlela (1952–2003), South African painter
Fikile Mbalula (born 1971), South African politician
Fikile Mthwalo (born 1989), Lesotho-born South African actress and script writer
Fikile Ntshangase, South African environmental activist